Simion Filip is a mathematician from Moldova with dual citizenship of Romania and Moldova. He is an associate professor of mathematics at the University of Chicago who works in dynamical systems and algebraic geometry.

Early life and education
Filip was born in Chișinău, where he grew up and attended the Moldo-Turkish "Orizont" Lyceum, graduating in 2005. He is a dual citizen of Romania and Moldova. In 2004 and 2005, Filip won a bronze medal and a silver medal respectively while representing Moldova at the International Mathematical Olympiad.

Filip graduated with an A.B. in mathematics from Princeton University in 2009. He attended Part III of the Mathematical Tripos at the University of Cambridge where he received a master's degree with distinction in 2010. He received his Ph.D. under the supervision of Alex Eskin at the University of Chicago in 2016.

Career
Filip spent two postdoctoral years as a Junior Fellow at Harvard University from 2016 to 2018, and another year at the Institute for Advanced Study. Since 2019, he has been an associate professor at the University of Chicago.

Awards
Filip received a five-year Clay Research Fellowship lasting from 2016 to 2021. In 2020, Filip was one of the recipients of the EMS Prize.

Research
Filip's research focuses on the interactions between dynamical systems and algebraic geometry. In particular, he studies dynamics on Teichmüller spaces and studies Hodge theory in complex geometry.

References

External links
 

Year of birth missing (living people)
Living people
Scientists from Chișinău
21st-century Romanian mathematicians
21st-century Moldovan mathematicians
International Mathematical Olympiad participants
Romanian expatriates in the United States
Moldovan expatriates in the United States
Princeton University alumni
Alumni of the University of Cambridge
University of Chicago alumni
University of Chicago faculty
Algebraic geometers
Dynamical systems theorists